The Iron Theatre is a novel by Otar Chiladze, published in  1981. It revives the end of 19th and beginning of 20th century in Georgia, and explores a conflict of life and art at the edge of new millennium. The plot of the novel is a mix of historical facts, real situations and the author's fantasy. The author frequently breaks the chronological order, to empower the reader to imagine the different situations and events from the different points of view and therefore creates a complete picture of the world that he wants to represent. The novel gained  Shota Rustaveli State Prize back in 1983.

"The Iron Theatre is an elegant novel about Georgia’s struggle for liberation, a “cocktail” of epic, lyrical prose, and internal monologue, written by a truly great writer. With the publication of this book Georgia returns to the map of world literature.” -  Weekendavisen Newspaper, Denmark

References

1981 novels
20th-century Georgian novels
Historical novels
Novels by Otar Chiladze
Georgian magic realism novels